Elisabeth Astrup Haarr (born 1945 in Hamar, Norway) is a Norwegian artist. Haarr is known for her textile works, which often take the form of sculptures or installations.

Early life and education
Haarr was born on 30 January 1945 in Hamar, Norway. She attended the Statens Håndverks- og Kunstindustriskole from 1964 through 1967.

Style and themes
Haarr's woven works incorporate a variety of techniques from pre-Columbian through Bauhaus (particularly Anni Albers) and rya rug weaving. She includes non-traditional materials such as grocery bags and other types of plastic, nylon and polyester in her work. Her work often have political themes such as the place of women in Norway and the fight against oppression.

Haarr's first solo exhibition was in 1973 at the Oslo Art Association after exhibiting in an experimental textile biennial in Spain. She went on to have solo exhibitions at the Asker museum, Tromsø Kunstforenin, Bodø Kunstforening, Ålesund Kunstforening, and Unge Kunstneres Samfunn.

Collections
Her work is included in the collections of the National Museum of Art, Architecture and Design, Oslo, the National Museum of Decorative Arts, Trondheim and the Norwegian Crafts Foundation. Her public works include pieces at the University of Tromsø, Roskilde University, and the Norwegian Cultural Council.

References

External links
 images of Haarr's work on the Textile Arts Center

Living people
1945 births
20th-century Norwegian women artists
21st-century Norwegian women artists
20th-century women textile artists
20th-century textile artists
21st-century women textile artists
21st-century textile artists
People from Hamar